The following is a list of sheriffs who have served Los Angeles County, California:

 * Appointed to fill the unexpired term of the predecessor
  Killed in the line of duty

See also

Los Angeles County Sheriff's Department

References

External links 
The 150 Year History of the Los Angeles County Sheriff's Department
Sheriffs of Los Angeles County
 Sven Crongeyer, 2006, Six Gun Sound : The Early History of the Los Angeles County Sheriff's Department, Linden Publishing, 

 
L A County Sheriffs
Politicians from Greater Los Angeles
Lists of county sheriffs in the United States